Qaymaqlı (also, Kaymagly and Kaymakhly) is a village and municipality in the Qazakh Rayon of Azerbaijan.  It has a population of 2,055.

References 

Populated places in Qazax District